Matías Pisano (born 13 December 1991) is an Argentine professional footballer who plays as a right winger for Aldosivi.

Club career

Chacarita 
Pisano started playing in the youth divisions of Chacarita Juniors and debuted in 2009 in a match against Fénix in the Primera B Nacional where he started from the bench and scored his first goal and the match ended in a 2–0 victory with an assistance of him in the final goal.

Independiente 
Pisano signed for Independiente in July 2013, requested by coach Miguel Brindisi to play in the Primera B Nacional after the club was relegated for the first time in their history.
At the end of the year he received the B Nacional Revelation Player by Diario Clarín

Atromitos 
On 30 June 2021, he was announced by Greek Super League side Atromitos as their fifth transfer for the upcoming season, on a one-year contract.

Career statistics

References

External links
 

1991 births
Living people
Footballers from Buenos Aires
Argentine footballers
Argentine expatriate footballers
Association football midfielders
Argentine Primera División players
Primera Nacional players
Primera B Metropolitana players
Liga MX players
Campeonato Brasileiro Série A players
Categoría Primera A players
Club Atlético Independiente footballers
Chacarita Juniors footballers
Cruzeiro Esporte Clube players
Santa Cruz Futebol Clube players
Club Tijuana footballers
Talleres de Córdoba footballers
Aldosivi footballers
América de Cali footballers
Al-Ittihad Kalba SC players
Atromitos F.C. players
Argentine expatriate sportspeople in Brazil
Argentine expatriate sportspeople in Mexico
Argentine expatriate sportspeople in Colombia
Argentine expatriate sportspeople in the United Arab Emirates
Argentine expatriate sportspeople in Greece
Expatriate footballers in Brazil
Expatriate footballers in Mexico
Expatriate footballers in Colombia
Expatriate footballers in the United Arab Emirates
Expatriate footballers in Greece